Bay Radio is an English language radio station for expatriates in Spain. It serves the Costa Blanca, broadcasting from Valencia to Torrevieja. The station is on-air 24 hours a day.

Programming

Weekdays
08.00am – 11.00am : Breakfast with Moody
11.00am – 15.00pm : A Dougie Lunchtime
15.00pm – 19.00pm : Afternoons with Kal (featuring Jon Gaunt's "Rental Illness Hour" every Thursday from 16:00pm-17:00pm)
19.00pm – 20.00pm : 70s at seven
20.00pm – 21.00pm : 80s at eight
21.00pm – 22.00pm : 90s at nine
22.00pm – 00.00am : Paul Breen Turner
00.00am – 08.00am : Overnight on Bay

Saturday
08.00am – 12.00pm : Wake Up With Mark Deakin
12.00am – 15.00pm : Ride On The Rhythm with Dougie Mack (includes the new Bay Radio Top 10 from 14:00pm)
15.00pm – 19.00pm : The Saturday Sports Show
19.00pm – 23.00pm : Saturday Night Party with Johnny Disco
23.00pm – 00.00am : Mr Mack's Ascension
00.00am – 02.00am : Lisa Gaunt's Deep Bath
02.00am – 08.00am : Overnight on Bay

Sunday
08.00am – 11.00am : The Lie in with Tony Myles
11.00am – 15.00pm : John Mair's Sunday Brunch
15.00pm – 18.00pm : Ready Steady Sundays with JC
18.00pm - 19.00pm : Deeply Dippy with Dipesh
19.00pm – 22.00pm : The 80's Sessions with Mark Deakin
23.00pm – 08.00am : Overnight on Bay

References

Radio stations in Spain